Home Wreckordings (Home Wreckordings 1997-1999) is a 2001 album by Rebecca Moore. As is implied by the title, it is made up of multitrack demos Moore recorded in her living room.

Track listing
 Stilleto'd Young Stars
 This/Past
 Thaw
 Live in Blue Sparks 
 Spectral Vapor in the Neural Machine 
 Cartoonlust
 Somehow
 Joy Will Come (a.k.a. Joe Will Cum)
 Forest at Night
 Fantasy
 Prevention of Blindness
 Sister Marianne

References

2001 albums
Rebecca Moore (artist) albums